Valprato Soana is a comune (municipality) in the Metropolitan City of Turin in the Italian region Piedmont, located about  north of Turin, in Val Soana, included in the Gran Paradiso National Park. It borders the municipalities of Cogne, Champorcher, Ronco Canavese, Traversella and Valchiusa.

References

Cities and towns in Piedmont
Canavese